Timothy Ferris (born August 29, 1944) is an American science writer and the best-selling author of twelve books, including The Science of Liberty (2010) and Coming of Age in the Milky Way (1988), for which he was awarded the American Institute of Physics Prize and was nominated for the Pulitzer Prize. He also wrote The Whole Shebang: A State-of-the-Universe(s) Report (1997), a popular science book on the study of the universe. Ferris has produced three PBS documentaries: The Creation of the Universe, Life Beyond Earth, and Seeing in the Dark.

Background and education 
Ferris is a native of Miami, Florida and a graduate of Coral Gables Senior High School. He attended Northwestern University, graduating in 1966 with majors in English and communications. He studied for one year at the Northwestern University Law School before joining United Press International as a reporter, working in New York City.

Writing and NASA
After starting his career as a newspaper reporter, Ferris became an editor at Rolling Stone, where he initially specialized in science journalism. Ferris produced the Voyager Golden Record, an artifact of human civilization containing music, sounds of Earth and encoded photographs launched aboard the Voyager 1 spacecraft. He has served as a consultant to NASA on long-term space exploration policy, and was among the journalists selected as candidates to fly aboard the Space Shuttle in 1986; the planned flight was cancelled due to the Challenger disaster. He was also a friend of and collaborator with American astronomer Carl Sagan.

Honors
Ferris is a Guggenheim fellow and a Fellow of the American Association for the Advancement of Science (AAAS). He won the Klumpke-Roberts Award of the Astronomical Society of the Pacific in 1986, and has twice won the American Institute of Physics science-writing medal and the American Association for the Advancement of Science writing prize.

Academe
Ferris has taught astronomy, English, history, journalism, and philosophy at four universities. He is an emeritus professor at the University of California, Berkeley.

Bibliography

Films
Producer, narrator, and writer, Seeing in the Dark, sixty-minute documentary film, PBS premier September 19, 2007; DVD and BR-DVD releases, PBS Home Video, 2008.
Author and narrator, Life Beyond Earth,  two-hour PBS television special, world premier November 10, 1999; DVD release, PBS Home Video, 2000.
Author and narrator, The Creation of the Universe, ninety-minute television science special; U.S. premier, PBS network, November 20, 1985; also broadcast in the United Kingdom, Japan, Sweden, Norway, Italy, Venezuela, and Brazil. Inaugural release, PBS Home Video, 1991; laserdisc release, Pacific Arts Video, 1992; CD-ROM release, The Voyager Company, 1993; DVD release, PBS Home Video, 2005.
Writer and narrator, segments on The MacNeil-Lehrer News Hour, PBS television: "Exploding Stars and the Origins of Human Civilization", October 21, 1993; "Pipe Organs and Particle Accelerators", June 8, 1993; "Columbus Day," October 7, 1992; and "The Voyager Encounter With Neptune," August 22, 1989.
Presenter, segment on American Epic, PBS premier May 30, 2017; also broadcast in the United Kingdom, Germany, France, Australia, Israel, Spain, and Brazil.  DVD and BR-DVD releases, PBS Home Video, 2017
He appeared in The Farthest, a 2017 documentary on the Voyager program.

References

External links 

 
 
 
 

1944 births
Living people
American agnostics
American science writers
National Geographic people
University of Southern California faculty
Northwestern University Pritzker School of Law alumni
Northwestern University School of Communication alumni
Smithsonian (magazine) people
Voyager program